Lizo Pumzile Gqoboka (born 24 March 1990) is a South African professional rugby union player for the South Africa national team, the  in Super Rugby and the  in the Currie Cup. His regular position is prop.

Career

Youth

Gqoboka's high school in Tabankulu (a village near Mount Frere in the Eastern Cape) did not play rugby and he concentrated on athletics (running 100m in 11.6 seconds) and soccer.

Gqoboka only started playing the sport aged 19 when he moved to Durban to study human resource management and there joined Durban Collegians Sports Club. He started off playing as a Number Eight and a Lock, but eventually moved to prop.

Eastern Province Kings

He made his first team debut against  on 16 March 2012, coming on as a late substitute. He started his first senior match against  a fortnight later.

He made a total of four appearances during the round-robin stages of the 2012 Currie Cup First Division to help the Eastern Province Kings finish top of the log.

Gqoboka was initially named in the  Super Rugby training squad for the 2013 Super Rugby season, but was later released. Instead, he played some Varsity Cup rugby with the  where he made three appearances to help the university side reached the semi-finals of the competition for the first time ever. Gqoboka then played a further six times in the 2013 Vodacom Cup and helped them qualify to the quarter-finals of the competition.

Gqoboka played in 15 of their 16 matches during the 2013 Currie Cup First Division season, as they reached the final of this competition for the fourth consecutive season.

Instead, he made five appearances for the  during the 2014 Vodacom Cup competition. He was selected in the starting line-up for the  side that faced  during a tour match during their 2014 tour to South Africa. He played for almost an hour in the match as the Kings suffered a 12–34 defeat.

With the Eastern Province Kings promoted to the 2014 Currie Cup Premier Division, Gqoboka made his first appearance in the Premier Division of this competition on 8 August 2014 when he was named in their run-on side for their opening match of the season against , which ended in a 16–35 defeat. He eventually made seven appearances in the competition as his side finished bottom of the log.

Gqoboka's personal performances didn't go unnoticed, however, as he earned an invitation to train with the Springboks in September 2014 alongside Nizaam Carr and Seabelo Senatla. He was once again invited to a Springbok training camp the following month.

Gqoboka left the Kings at the end of 2015, after the non-payment of player salaries allowed him to disengage himself from his contract.

South Africa 'A'

In 2016, Gqoboka was included in a South Africa 'A' squad that played a two-match series against a touring England Saxons team. He came on as a replacement in their first match in Bloemfontein, but ended on the losing side as the visitors ran out 32–24 winners. He also played off the bench in the second match of the series, a 26–29 defeat to the Saxons in George.

Honours
 Currie Cup winner 2020–21
 Pro14 Rainbow Cup runner-up 2021
 Bulls Currie Cup Player of the Year 2022

References

External links
 

1990 births
Living people
People from Ntabankulu Local Municipality
Xhosa people
South African rugby union players
South Africa international rugby union players
Rugby union props
Eastern Province Elephants players
Bulls (rugby union) players
Blue Bulls players
Montpellier Hérault Rugby players
Expatriate rugby union players in France
Rugby union players from the Eastern Cape